Stewart Mulvey (May 1834 – 26 May 1908) was a Canadian teacher, newspaper editor, militia officer, office holder and politician.

Born in Sligo, Ireland, the son of Henry Mulvey and Barbara McGee, Mulvey was a teacher starting at the age of 16 in Irish National School system and the schools of the Church Educational Society. In 1856, he emigrated to Canada East at the invitation of Egerton Ryerson, the superintendent of education for Canada East, settling in Haldimand County where he was a teacher and editor of the local newspaper. He also served as a lieutenant in the 37th (Haldimand) Battalion of Rifles.

In 1870, he joined the Red River expeditionary force and left for Winnipeg. From 1871 to 1873, Mulvey was editor of the Winnipeg newspaper, the Manitoba Liberal. From 1873 to 1882, he was a collector with the Department of Inland Revenue. During the North-West Rebellion, he served as a major in the 95th Battalion (Manitoba Grenadiers). A Protestant, he was active in the Orange Lodge in Winnipeg.

From 1883 to 1888, he was an alderman on the Winnipeg City Council. In the 1882 election, he ran unsuccessfully for the House of Commons of Canada for the electoral district of Selkirk. In 1896, he was elected to the Legislative Assembly of Manitoba for the electoral district of Morris. An independent, he was defeated in 1899.

References
 

1834 births
1908 deaths
19th-century Irish people
Candidates in the 1882 Canadian federal election
Independent MLAs in Manitoba
Irish emigrants to pre-Confederation Ontario
Irish expatriates in Canada
People of the North-West Rebellion
People of the Red River Rebellion
Politicians from County Sligo
Winnipeg city councillors
People from Sligo (town)
Immigrants to the Province of Canada